James Rhyne Killian Jr. (July 24, 1904 – January 29, 1988) was the 10th president of the Massachusetts Institute of Technology, from 1948 until 1959.

Early life
Killian was born on July 24, 1904, in Blacksburg, South Carolina. His father was a textile maker. He attended The McCallie School in Chattanooga, TN  later studied at Duke University (formerly Trinity University) for two years until he transferred to MIT, where he received a Bachelor of Business Administration  and engineering administration in 1926. While there, he was a member of the Sigma Chi fraternity.

Career

Leadership at MIT
In 1932, while serving as the editor of MIT's alumni magazine Technology Review, Killian was instrumental in the founding of Technology Press, the publishing imprint that would later become the institute's independent publishing house, MIT Press. He became executive assistant to MIT President Karl Taylor Compton in 1939, and co-directed the wartime operation of MIT, which strongly supported military research and development. He was from 1948 until 1959 the 10th president of MIT.
In 1956, James R. Killian Jr was named as the 1st Chair to the new President's Foreign Intelligence Advisory Board by the Eisenhower Administration; a position which he held until April 1963.

Advisor to the President of the U.S.
On leave from MIT he served as Special Assistant for Science and Technology to President Eisenhower from 1957 to 1959, making him the first true Presidential Science Advisor. Killian headed the Killian Committee and oversaw the creation of the President's Science Advisory Committee (PSAC) shortly after the launches of the Soviet artificial satellites, Sputnik 1 and Sputnik 2, in October and November 1957. PSAC was instrumental in initiating national curriculum reforms in science and technology and in establishing the National Aeronautics and Space Administration (NASA).

Killian described an environment of "widespread discouragement" facing scientists and, in particular, scientists of the Technological Capabilities Panel, which had been convened by U.S. President Dwight D. Eisenhower to develop technological solutions to the perceived possibility of a surprise nuclear attack by the Soviet Union. This stifling work atmosphere was caused by the widely cast, groundless aspersions of Senator Joseph McCarthy and the removal of Robert Oppenheimer from work on sensitive military projects. Oppenheimer had expressed support for shifting U.S. military resources from offensive nuclear weapons to defensive capabilities, and following Oppenheimer's loss of his security clearance, scientists felt that it was inadvisable to challenge the thinking of the military establishment.

Awards and autobiography
In 1956 Killian was awarded the Public Welfare Medal from the National Academy of Sciences. He co-authored a book, The Education of a College President (1985), which serves as an autobiography as well. After stepping down as president of MIT in 1959, he served as chairman of the MIT Corporation from 1959 until 1971.

Death 
Killian died on January 29, 1988, in Cambridge, Massachusetts.

Legacy 
Two locations on MIT's campus bear the name Killian: Killian Court, a tree-lined courtyard with views of MIT's Great Dome, and Killian Hall, a concert hall (actually named after Killian's wife, Elizabeth Parks Killian, a Wellesley College alumna).

References

Further reading

External links
 Killian, James Rhyne, "The Obligations and Ideals of an Institute of Technology", The Inaugural Address, Tenth President of the Massachusetts Institute of Technology, April 2, 1949
Official MIT biography
 Welzenbach, Donald E., "SCIENCE AND TECHNOLOGY: ORIGINS OF A DIRECTORATE", March 15, 1953. Discussion of Killian's involvement with the C.I.A. and Pres. Eisenhower
Records of the White House Office of the Special Assistant for Science and Technology, Dwight D. Eisenhower Presidential Library

|-

|-

|-

1904 births
1988 deaths
Massachusetts Institute of Technology alumni
MIT Sloan School of Management alumni
Office of Science and Technology Policy officials
Peabody Award winners
Presidents of the Massachusetts Institute of Technology
United States Army Science Board people
American scientists
Duke University Trinity College of Arts and Sciences alumni
People from Blacksburg, South Carolina
20th-century American academics